Joseph Michael Stampf (December 16, 1919 – April 20, 1985) was an American professional basketball player and college coach. He played for the Chicago American Gears in the National Basketball League during the 1944–45 season and averaged 3.0 points per game.

Stampf played college basketball at the University of Chicago, where in 1940–41 he led the Big Ten Conference in scoring despite his squad going winless. Years later, he became the program's head coach when he took over in 1957. In 18 seasons, Stampf compiled an overall record of 208–118, which through 2018–19 is the second-most wins in school history.

Head coaching record

References

1919 births
1985 deaths
Amateur Athletic Union men's basketball players
American men's basketball players
Basketball coaches from Illinois
Basketball players from Chicago
Centers (basketball)
Chicago American Gears players
Chicago Maroons men's basketball coaches
Chicago Maroons men's basketball players
Forwards (basketball)
Sportspeople from Chicago